Ana María Francisca Adinolfi (stage name, Violeta Rivas; 4 October 1937 – 23 June 2018) was an Argentine singer and actress, known for participating in the music program El Club del Clan, along with Palito Ortega, Raúl Lavié, Johnny Tedesco and Chico Novarro.

Biography 

Rivas was born in Chivilcoy, Buenos Aires Province, in 1937. At the age of five, she participated in a contest in Chivilcoy singing the songs of Clavito Chino and Los Gitanos. A year later, she was chosen by her school to sing in the choir of the Postal Savings Bank. She subsequently studied lyrical singing. Rivas married Néstor Fabián and they had a daughter. 

In 1960, she became contracted for four months to perform in Buenos Aires. The director, Ricardo Mejía, gave her the stage name Violeta Rivas. That same year, she recorded a duet with Bobby Capó, Llorando me dormí, which became one of the radio hits of 1960. Shortly after, she recorded her first major success as a solo artist, Burbuja azul. In 1962, she debuted on Canal 7, participating in the program's El hit de sus favoritos as well as in El Club del Clan. 

In Lima, Peru, she received the award for Best Foreign Singer. In December 1964, she began filming Fiebre de Junio. She also performed "¡Que Suerte!" in Uruguay, which became her greatest hit, along with Chico Novarro and Palito Ortega. By 1965, after developing a successful solo career, Rivas toured Latin America singing melodic songs. After the 1960s, she continued to perform in other films and to sing other songs such as "Colorado", "El Baile del Ladrillo", "El Cardenal", among others.

Discography 
 1963: Violeta Rivas - RCA VICTOR ARGENTINA
 1964: Que Suerte - RCA VICTOR ARGENTINA
 1964: Serie Consagración - RCA ARGENTINA
 1964: Serie Consagración - RCA URUGUAY
 1965: Violeta Rivas con amor - RCA VICTOR ARGENTINA
 1965: Fiebre de primavera - RCA ARGENTINA
 1965: Fiebre de primavera - RCA VENEZUELA
 1965: Nacidos para cantar - Junto a Juan Ramón - RCA VICTOR
 1965: Violeta Rivas - RCA VICTOR ARGENTINA
 1965: Violeta Rivas - RCA PERU
 1966: Lo mejor de Violeta Rivas - RCA ECUADOR
 1966: Violeta Rivas interpreta canciones del Festival de San Remo 1966 - RCA VICTOR ARGENTINA
 1967: Lo mejor de Violeta Rivas - RCA VICTOR ARGENTINA
 1967: Violeta Rivas - RCA VICTOR ARGENTINA
 1968: El picaflor y la rosa - RCA VICTOR ARGENTINA
 1969: Lo mejor de Violeta Rivas - RCA VICTOR ARGENTINA
 1969: Violeta Rivas - RCA PERU
 1969: Voy cantando con Violeta Rivas - RCA VICTOR PUERTO RICO
 1970: Hay Música - RCA VICTOR ARGENTINA
 1973: El ángel del amor - MICROFON-IFESA ECUADOR
 1976: Violeta Rivas - CABAL ARGENTINA
 1976: Soy tu eterna enamorada - ALFA-MICROFON ECUADOR
 1978: Una Violeta en Brodway - CARISMA RECORD ESTADOS UNIDOS
 1978: Una Violeta en Brodway - LLUVIA DE ESTRELLAS ECUADOR
 1979: Es mi Hombre - ALHAMBRA ESTADOS UNIDOS
 1980: Súper Hits - DISCOLOR ESTADOS UNIDOS
 1981: Grandes Éxitos de Violeta Rivas - RCA ARGENTINA
 1992: Cronología - BMG ARGENTINA
 1994: Violeta Rivas en vivo - REALIZADO POR FANS
 1997: Serie 20 Éxitos - BMG ARGENTINA
 1997: Inéditos, rarezas y otras perlas - BMG ARGENTINA
 1998: Violeta Rivas en Vivo 2 - REALIZADO POR FANS
 1998: Serie El Club del Clan - BMG ARGENTINA
 2000: Salsa Ultra Violeta - ARGENTINA
 2004: 20 Secretos de amor - BMG ARGENTINA

Filmography 
 1964: Buenas noches, Buenos Aires 
 1964: El Club del Clan 
 1965: Fiebre de primavera 
 1965: Nacidos para cantar
 1967: Mi secretaria está loca... loca... loca ...Malena Elías
 1969: ¡Viva la vida!

References

Bibliography

External links

 Violeta Rivas at Cinenacional

1937 births
2018 deaths
Latin pop singers
Spanish-language singers
20th-century Argentine women singers
People from Chivilcoy
Argentine pop singers
Burials at La Chacarita Cemetery